Ceriagrion kordofanicum is a species of damselfly in the family Coenagrionidae. It is found in Kenya, Malawi, Mozambique, Sudan, Tanzania, Uganda, Zambia, and possibly Burundi. Its natural habitats are rivers, intermittent rivers, shrub-dominated wetlands, swamps, freshwater lakes, intermittent freshwater lakes, freshwater marshes, and intermittent freshwater marshes. It is threatened by habitat loss.

References

Coenagrionidae
Insects described in 1924
Taxonomy articles created by Polbot